Bethany Historic District is a national historic district located at Bethany, Brooke County, West Virginia. It encompasses 111 contributing buildings on the campus of Bethany College, the central business district, and surrounding residential areas in Bethany.  Notable buildings include the Gothic Revival-style Irvin Gymnasium at Bethany College (c. 1918), Point Breeze Mansion (c. 1880), Old Opera House (c. 1870), Chambers General Store (c. 1900), and the Federal-style Hibernia Hall (c. 1830). Also in the district are a number of residences in popular architectural styles including Late Victorian. Located within the district are the separately listed Alexander Campbell Mansion, Delta Tau Delta Founders House, Old Bethany Church, Old Main, and Pendleton Heights.

It was listed on the National Register of Historic Places in 1982.

References

External links

National Register of Historic Places in Brooke County, West Virginia
Historic districts in Brooke County, West Virginia
Federal architecture in West Virginia
Gothic Revival architecture in West Virginia
Victorian architecture in West Virginia
Houses in Brooke County, West Virginia
Houses on the National Register of Historic Places in West Virginia
Commercial buildings on the National Register of Historic Places in West Virginia
Historic districts on the National Register of Historic Places in West Virginia